Jamil Omar Hatem Abdulalem Jamil El Reedy, born October 22, 1965 in Cairo, is a retired Egyptian alpine skier.  El Reedy grew up in Plattsburgh, New York, USA.

He was Egypt's sole representative at the 1984 Winter Olympics in Sarajevo. As such, he attracted lasting media attention, particularly when it was reported that he had "prepared by spending 40 days in a cave in the Egyptian desert". He finished 46th out of 101 in the slalom, 60th out of 61 in the downhill event, and did not complete the giant slalom, thus being eliminated. El Reedy did not participate the next games in Calgary.

References

1965 births
Living people
Egyptian male alpine skiers
Olympic alpine skiers of Egypt
Alpine skiers at the 1984 Winter Olympics
Sportspeople from Cairo